The Football Aficionado is a long-feature social documentary film co-directed and co-produced by Sharmin Mojtahedzadeh & Paliz Khoshdel. The subject of the film targets gender discrimination and women's rights in Iran.

Story 

The film's story is about Zahra, a 27-year-old Iranian girl living in Tehran and a big fan of Persepolis, one of the capital’s biggest football teams. She has always wished to watch her favorite team as well as the Iranian national team’s games at the stadium. However, according to an unwritten law, women are not allowed to go to stadiums and watch football games. For this reason, Zahra decides to disguise herself as a man to be able to enter the stadium without foreseeing that her action would go viral across social media and be covered by the popular press, giving the example to other women and starting a movement against this discrimination.

International awards and screening 

The film has been awarded the best Asian documentary, the Mecenat Award, at 27 Busan International Film Festival (BIFF) in October 2022

References

External links 
 
 
 

Sport in Iran
Iranian documentary films
Iranian documentary filmmakers